Matt Hannaford is an MLBPA certified player agent and the President and CEO of ALIGND Sports Agency, a boutique athlete management firm built to represent not only the best players in Major League Baseball but those inspired to make the biggest impact on society and future generations. Prior to forming ALIGND, Hannaford was the co-founder and Executive Vice President of MVP Sports Group where he was influential in building an agency that had negotiated over $1.7 Billion Dollars in contracts prior to his departure.

Career
Hannaford grew up in Rancho Murieta California, a private golfing community located east of Sacramento. He played baseball at Elk Grove High School, a school that has produced more Major League Baseball Players on opening day rosters in 2019 than any other high school in the continental United States. Upon graduation, Hannaford continued his playing career at Sacramento City College before transferring to Long Beach State where he would complete a degree in Business Finance. Hannaford was approached by various players seeking advice on their playing careers, leading him to educate himself more on the agent business and to eventually retire from baseball and take a position at a sports agency while still in college. In 2002, Hannaford began working at Beverly Hills Sports Council, an agency that represented stars such as Barry Bonds, Curt Schilling, Jose Canseco, Rickey Henderson, Mike Piazza, Trevor Hoffman, Brett Saberhagen and George Brett.

MVP Sports Group
In May 2010, Hannaford left BHSC and helped form MVP Sports Group. There he helped build an agency into one of the premier sports agencies in the business. Hannaford was influential in the management of such stars as Manny Machado who signed a 10 year, $300 Million deal in February 2019 with the San Diego Padres, 3x MVP Award Winner Albert Pujols and MVP Award Winner's Joey Votto, Josh Donaldson and Jimmy Rollins.

Hannaford also represented some of the game's most popular players prior to their retirement including Nick Swisher, Brian Wilson and Carlos Beltrán. Beyond the stars in the Major Leagues, Hannaford has been responsible for representing some of the game's best young player's including Michael Taylor, J.D. Davis, Dylan Carlson, Austin Riley, Isiah Kiner Falefa and Jeremiah Jackson. Hannaford is also the Godfather to long time client Kurt Suzuki's son Kai.

ALIGND Sports Agency 
In October 2020, Hannaford left MVP Sports Group  and launched ALIGND Sports Agency. That off-season he negotiated Liam Hendriks' $54 million dollar contract with the Chicago White Sox, a deal that drew widespread praise throughout the industry. On August 1, 2022 the Atlanta Braves inked Austin Riley to a 10 year contract worth $212 Million Dollars. A deal negotiated by Hannaford and the largest contract in Braves history.

At ALIGND Hannaford remains focused on building an agency with the intent of expanding the sports representation business beyond simply the negotiation of contracts and deeper into the lives of the clients who they serve.

Contracts 
Hannaford played an integral part in 3 of the top 10 largest contracts in baseball history, including Manny Machado's 10-year, $300 million deal with the San Diego Padres, Albert Pujols' 10 year, $240 million deal with the Los Angeles Angels of Anaheim and Joey Votto's 10 year, $225 million extension with the Cincinnati Reds.

Hannaford negotiated multiple record breaking contracts recently. In January of 2021, he negotiated a $54 million dollar contract for All-Star Closer Liam Hendriks which paid Hendriks the largest AAV of any relief pitcher in history, and in 2022 he negotiated the largest contract in Braves history, a 10-year $212 Million Dollar contract for Austin Riley.

References

External links
 https://www.aligndsports.com/

Living people
American sports agents
1981 births